Law and Disorder is a 1958 British crime comedy film directed by Charles Crichton and starring Michael Redgrave, Robert Morley, Joan Hickson, and Lionel Jeffries. It was based on the 1954 novel Smugglers' Circuit by Denys Roberts. The film was started by director Henry Cornelius, who died whilst making the film.  He was replaced by Charles Crichton.

Plot
Percy Brand is a career criminal, a veteran of various cons and schemes, and he is regularly sent to prison by judge Sir Edward Crichton. That does not bother Percy too much, but what does concern him is that his son, Colin, should not discover what his father does. Percy tells him tales about being a missionary in China when he is released in 1938, a military chaplain in North Africa in 1941, and a freed prisoner of war in 1946 to cover his absences in gaol. While Percy is "away", Colin is cared for by Aunt Florence, who knows what Percy really does.

When Colin grows up, he chooses to become a barrister. By coincidence, he takes seven years to achieve his goal, the same duration as Percy's latest sentence. When Percy is freed, he arrives just after Colin is called to the bar. Colin informs him that he has secured a position as an unpaid marshal, i.e. an aide, to a judge to gain experience, and not just to any judge, but to Percy's nemesis, Edward Crichton. Percy decides to retire from his life of crime rather than risk coming into court and Colin seeing him there.

Retirement to a cottage on the south coast of England is not enough to keep Percy (and Florence) out of mischief. When he hears about the smuggling that took place before the conscientious Police Sergeant Bolton arrived, Percy gets involved in bringing in brandy from France, hidden inside sharks he "catches".

Then, an old acquaintance, Major Proudfoot, comes to see him. Proudfoot has planted a story that an explorer was murdered and robbed of 100,000 quid of emeralds he found in Brazil. Now he has a buyer lined up for the nonexistent jewels, which he wants Percy to pretend to smuggle in. Percy has a better idea, involving fake policemen and himself as a customs officer, but the plan goes awry when Judge Crichton arrives to meet his wife, returning from a trip abroad. Percy manages to steal a launch, but is eventually caught. To compound his misfortune, he is to be tried by Crichton, a last-minute substitute for a judge afflicted with gout.

Florence comes up with the idea to add a fake case to the docket to occupy Crichton's remaining time on that particular circuit court, with the assistance of Percy's friends and associates. Mary Cooper brings her publican husband into court over a slander repeatedly uttered by their pet parrot. However, the judge becomes fed up with the case and finally dismisses it, leaving Percy's trial for the next day. The gang members then try to frame Crichton for smuggling by planting contraband in the car they arrange for the judge and Colin to take that night, and then making an anonymous call to tip off the customs agents. Crichton decides to take a walk first, and  Colin and he get lost. They inadvertently trigger a burglar alarm when they reach a house, and are taken at gunpoint to the police station.

Colin later "confesses"  to try to straighten things out, but is not in time to prevent the judge and Percy from being driven in the same van to the assizes. Along the way, Percy confesses everything to Crichton, who is amused. He sends Colin on an errand so that, when Percy is brought into the courtroom, Colin is absent. The judge then recuses himself, as he has had social contact with the defendant, leaving Colin none the wiser. Out on bail, but expecting another long prison sentence, Percy bids farewell to Colin, telling him that he has come out of retirement for one more trip.

Cast

 Michael Redgrave as Percy Brand
 Robert Morley as Judge Sir Edward Crichton
 Ronald Squire as Colonel Masters
 Elizabeth Sellars as Gina Laselle
 Joan Hickson as Aunt Florence
 Lionel Jeffries as Major Proudfoot
 Jeremy Burnham as Colin Brand
 Brenda Bruce as Mrs Mary Cooper
 Harold Goodwin as Blacky
 George Coulouris as Bennie [Bensuson]
 Meredith Edwards as Sergeant Bolton
 Reginald Beckwith as Vickery
 David Hutcheson as Freddie [Cooper]
 Mary Kerridge as Lady Crichton
 Michael Trubshawe as Ivan
 John Le Mesurier as Pomfret
 Irene Handl as Woman in Train
 Allan Cuthbertson as Police Inspector
 Sam Kydd as Shorty
 John Hewer as Foxy
 John Warwick as Police Superintendent
 Nora Nicholson as Mrs. Cartwright
 Anthony Sagar as Customs Officer
 John Paul as Customs Officer
 Alfred Burke as Poacher
 Michael Brennan as Warden Ext. Prison
 Toke Townley as Rumpthorne
 Arthur Howard as Burrows
 John Rudling as Man in Train
 Gerald Cross as Hodgkin

Production
Charles Crichton said "the producer was a clot of the first order, he didn't know what he was doing. I had to fight him all the time." Crichton says the producer cut out a sequence "without which the end of the film is pretty incomprehensible."

Critical reception
A. H. Weiler wrote in The New York Times: "Robert Morley contributes an outstanding performance as the stern judge who finds himself as much outside the law as within it. Although he never cracks a smile, chances are he will force a few on the customers. As a matter of fact, they should find most of the cheerful disorders in Law and Disorder irreverently funny and diverting". The TV Guide review stated it had "a tight screenplay, with not a word wasted, and sharp acting by some of England's best characters. This is a good example of the 1950s Brit-coms and there is so much joy in watching Morley acting with Redgrave that it seems a shame a series of films weren't made with these two characters pitted against each other."

References

External links

1958 films
1950s crime comedy films
British black-and-white films
British crime comedy films
British Lion Films films
Films shot at Associated British Studios
Films based on British novels
Films directed by Charles Crichton
Films scored by Humphrey Searle
Films set in 1938
Films set in 1941
Films set in 1946
Films set in England
1958 comedy films
Films produced by Paul Soskin
1950s English-language films
1950s British films